The Capture of Mosul occurred in 1517 when the Ottomans captured the city from the Safavids.

In 1517 Mosul was possessed by the Safavids. It was in the hands of the Safavid Ahmed Bey Afshar. Beylerbey of Diyarbakir Bıyıklı Mehmed Pasha with the support of Bedir Bey captured Mosul from Ahmed Bey Afshar in April 1517 and annexed it to the Ottoman Empire. After the conquest of Mosul it was transformed into a sanjak and connected to Diyarbakir.

References

Battles involving the Ottoman Empire